Loaded is a 2008 American crime thriller film starring Jesse Metcalfe, Corey Large, Monica Keena, Nathalie Kelley and Chace Crawford, directed by Alan Pao.

Synopsis
Tristan Price is a wealthy and privileged teenager who seemingly has everything he could ever want, money, loving parents and a beautiful girlfriend. However, his perfect life is turned upside down by the arrival of Sebastian, a handsome, charismatic, ruthless drug dealer. As Tristan is sucked into a seedy underworld of drugs, sex and violence he begins to realise his new best friend is, in fact, his worst enemy.

Cast
Jesse Metcalfe as Tristan Price 
Corey Large as Sebastian 
Monica Keena as Brooke 
Nathalie Kelley as April 
Chace Crawford as Hayden Price 
Johnny Messner as Javon 
Jimmy Jean-Louis as Antonio 
Vinnie Jones as Mr. Black 
Mitchell Baker as Damon 
Mary Christina Brown as Lin

External links

 

2008 films
2008 crime thriller films
2008 action thriller films
American crime thriller films
American action thriller films
2000s English-language films
Films about drugs
American gangster films
2000s American films